The Years of the City is a novel by Frederik Pohl published in 1984.

Plot summary
The Years of the City is a novel in which a utopia is built from New York in five linked stories.

Reception
Dave Langford reviewed The Years of the City for White Dwarf #64, and stated that "There are corny elements (like the traditional whores and crooks with hearts of gold in story 1) and things I can't believe; but overall it's impressive, with enough 'realistic' bitterness to make us cynics swallow the sugary core of optimism."

Reviews
Review by Dan Chow (1984) in Locus, #281 June 1984
Review by Patricia Hernlund (1985) in Fantasy Review, January 1985
Review by Robert Coulson (1985) in Amazing Stories, March 1985
Review by Algis Budrys (1985) in The Magazine of Fantasy & Science Fiction, March 1985
Review by Tom Easton (1985) in Analog Science Fiction/Science Fact, April 1985
Review by Kenny Mathieson (1985) in Foundation, #35 Winter 1985/1986, (1986)

References

1984 American novels
1984 science fiction novels
American science fiction novels
Novels by Frederik Pohl
Novels set in the future
Novels set in New York City